Fragaria nubicola is a species of wild strawberry native to the Himalayas. It is of no commercial value.

All strawberries have a base haploid count of 7 chromosomes. Fragaria nubicola is diploid, having 2 pairs of these chromosomes for a total of 14 chromosomes.

Genomics

References

External links

 G.M. Darrow, The Strawberry: History, Breeding and Physiology.  Online version, chapter 8.
 

nubicola